Net Lake is located within the municipality of Temagami, in the Nipissing District, Ontario, Canada. It covers a length of 10 km and is located in Temagami North. Fish in the lake include walleye, northern pike, trout, smallmouth bass, whitefish and panfish. There is only one lodge on Net Lake, which is called Andorra Lodge.

References

See also
Lakes of Temagami

Strathy Township
Lakes of Temagami